Ein Hoga is a spring situated  north-east of Bet She'an, and to the east of the Kibbutz at Hamadia. It is one of the most important sources of water in the Bet She'an valley. 

To the east of the spring there are the remains of a neolithic village.

near the place was palestinians village named Al-Hamidiyya in whats today is now kibbutz of hamadia

Springs of Israel